Notopus is a genus of frog crabs from the family Raninidae, it consists of a single extant species and two extinct species.

Species
The three species classified under Notopus are set out below together with the geological frame for the two extinct species which are marked with †:

Notopus beyrichi† Bittner, 1875 - middle Eocene-lower Oligocene
 Notopus dorsipes (Linnaeus, 1758)
 Notopus muelleri† (van Binkhorst, 1857) - upper Maastrichtian

References

Crabs